Sugar Creek is a river located in Yates County, New York. It flows into Keuka Lake by Branchport, New York.

References

Rivers of Yates County, New York
Rivers of New York (state)